The 2014 Saudi Super Cup was the second Saudi Super Cup, an annual Saudi football match contested by the winners of the Saudi Professional League and the winners of the King Cup of Champions. Al-Shabab won the match, prevailing 4–3 on penalties.

Match details

References
Thesaff.com.sa
Thesaff.com.sa
Au.soccerway.com

Saudi Super Cup
2014–15 in Saudi Arabian football
Al Nassr FC matches
Al Shabab FC (Riyadh) matches
Saudi Super Cup 2014